Elkin Creek Mill is a historic grist mill located near West Elkin, Wilkes County, North Carolina. It was built about 1896, and is a two-story, rectangular frame structure on fieldstone piers.  It has a one-story gable roofed wing and one-story shed addition.  The milling equipment remains in place in the building. Also on the property is a contributing four stall stable.

It was listed on the National Register of Historic Places in 1982.

References

Grinding mills on the National Register of Historic Places in North Carolina
Grinding mills in North Carolina
Industrial buildings completed in 1896
Buildings and structures in Wilkes County, North Carolina
National Register of Historic Places in Wilkes County, North Carolina
1896 establishments in North Carolina